Abdollahabad (also Romanized as ‘Abdollāhābād; also known as ‘Abdolābād and ‘Abdullāhābād) is a village in Kabutar Khan Rural District, in the Central District of Rafsanjan County, Kerman Province, Iran. At the 2006 census, its population was 1,614, in 368 families.

References 

Populated places in Rafsanjan County